István Ádám Kovács (born 27 March 1992) is a Hungarian football player. He is a midfielder who began his career at Haladás.

International career
On 22 March 2013, he made his international debut for Hungary as he came on as a substitute against Romania in the 79th minute.

Club statistics

Honours
Videoton
 Nemzeti Bajnokság I: 2014–15, 2017–18
 Magyar Kupa: 2018–19
 Hungarian League Cup: 2011–12
 Szuperkupa: 2012

References 

Haladas Fc
Illes Academia
HLSZ

1992 births
People from Vasvár
Sportspeople from Szombathely
Living people
Hungarian footballers
Hungary youth international footballers
Hungary under-21 international footballers
Hungary international footballers
Association football midfielders
Szombathelyi Haladás footballers
Fehérvár FC players
Győri ETO FC players
Nemzeti Bajnokság I players
Nemzeti Bajnokság II players